Delacău may refer to several places in Moldova:

Delacău, Anenii Noi, a commune in Anenii Noi district
Delacău, Transnistria, a commune in Transnistria